The 2008 MLS Cup Playoffs were the postseason to Major League Soccer's 2008 season, and culminated with MLS Cup 2008 on November 23, 2008 at The Home Depot Center in Carson, California.

Format

At the 2008 season's end, the top three teams of each conference made the playoffs; in addition the clubs with the next two highest point totals, regardless of conference, were added to the playoffs. In the first round of this knockout tournament, aggregate goals over two matches determined the winners; the Conference Championships were one match each, with the winner of each conference advancing to MLS Cup.  In all rounds, the tie-breaking method was two 15-minute periods of extra time, followed by penalty kicks if necessary.  The away goals rule was not used.

Standings

Conference standings

Overall standings

Bracket

1 The New York Red Bulls earned the eighth and final playoff berth, despite finishing fifth in the Eastern Conference. They represent the fourth seed in the Western Conference playoff bracket, as only three teams in the Western Conference qualified for the playoffs.

Conference Semifinals

Conference finals

MLS Cup

Additional References
MLS Cup 2008
MLS Cup Playoffs
2008 Major League Soccer season

MLS Cup Playoffs